is a Japanese idol singer, actress and fashion model. She is a former first generation member of the Japanese girl group Nogizaka46 and a regular model for the fashion magazine sweet. Her lead roles as an actress have included Mana Hayase in the Japanese remake of You Are the Apple of My Eye, and Midori Asakusa in both the film and TV adaptations of Keep Your Hands Off Eizouken!.

Early life 
Saitō was born on August 10, 1998 in Tokyo. Her mother is from Myanmar and her father is from Japan. Saitō debuted as an actress in 2007 in the film Sakuran, playing the protagonist as a child.

Career 
In 2011, encouraged by her mother, she successfully passed the audition for the first generation of idol group Nogizaka46, debuting as an idol on the group's first single "Guruguru Curtain" in February 2012. Saitō became the center member on the 15th Nogizaka46 single, "Hadashi de Summer", in 2016.

Saitō is active as an actress and model outside of Nogizaka46. She has played lead roles in the Japanese remake of the Taiwanese film You Are the Apple of My Eye and the NTV horror drama Zambi. In 2015, Saitō became the exclusive model for the fashion magazine CUTiE published by Takarajimasha, which stopped publication in the same year. Saitō then became a regular model for another fashion magazine from the same publisher, sweet, as the magazine's youngest model since its publication.

In 2017, Gentosha published Saitō's first photobook. Titled Shiosai, the photobook sold 58,215 copies in the first week. As of December 2018, the photobook has sold over 200 thousand copies.

Saitō announced her graduation from Nogizaka46 on November 4th, 2022. She will stay in the group until the end of 2022 and plans a graduation concert in 2023. She is the penultimate first generation member to leave the group. Asuka graduated from the group on December 31st, 2022.

Discography

Singles with Nogizaka46

Albums with Nogizaka46

Other featured songs

Filmography

Film

Television

Bibliography

Photobooks
 Kikan Nogizaka vol.3 Ryōshū (4 September 2014, Tokyo News Service) 
 Shiosai (25 January 2017, Gentosha)

Notes

References

External links

Living people
1998 births
21st-century Japanese women singers
21st-century Japanese singers
21st-century Japanese actresses
J-pop singers
Japanese child actresses
Japanese female models
Japanese idols
Japanese people of Burmese descent
Nogizaka46 members
Singers from Tokyo